Sabina Alkire is the director of the Oxford Poverty and Human Development Initiative (OPHI), an economic research centre within the Oxford Department of International Development at the University of Oxford, England, which was established in 2007. She is a fellow of the Human Development and Capability Association. She has worked with organizations such as the Commission on the Measurement of Economic Performance and Social Progress, the United Nations Human Development Programme Human Development Report Office, the European Commission, and the UK's Department for International Development.

Alkire and fellow OPHI member economist James Foster developed the Alkire Foster Method, a method of measuring multidimensional poverty. It includes identifying ‘who is poor’ by considering the range of deprivations they suffer, and aggregating that information to reflect societal poverty.
The application and implementation of the Alkire-Foster (AF) method produced a Multidimensional Poverty Index (MPI), a tool to identify the range of poverty among a population based on specified indicators.

Biography 
Born in Göttingen, West Germany, she left to the United States of America as a baby when her father took up a role teaching chemical engineering at the University of Illinois at Urbana–Champaign. Alkire studied at the same university, graduating in 1989 with a Bachelor of Arts in sociology. Afterwards, Alkire moved to England and attended the University of Oxford, where she obtained a diploma of theology with a distinction in Islam in 1992.

 Furthering her postgraduate studies at the University of Oxford, Alkire went on to receive a Master of Philosophy in Christian political ethics and a Master of Science in economics for development in 1994 and 1995, respectively. For her Master of Science thesis, "The Full or Minimally Decent Life: Empiricization of Sen’s Capabilities Approach in Poverty Measurement", she was awarded the George Webb Medley Graduate Prize by the university. Later, she gained her doctorate in economics from Magdalen College, University of Oxford in 1999. Her doctoral thesis, which demonstrated how the work of Indian economist and philosopher Amartya Sen could be coherently and practically put to use in poverty reduction activities, was later published as a monograph with the title Valuing Freedoms: Sen's Capability Approach and Poverty Reduction (2002).

From 1999 to 2001, Alkire worked as the coordinator for Culture and Poverty Learning-Research Program, World Bank, and PREM. From 2001 to 2003, she moved on to working for the Commission on Human Security as a research writer. From 2003 to 2013 Alkire continued her career as a research associate at the Harvard Global Equity Initiative at Harvard University. During her time there she won the Thulin Scholar of Religion and Contemporary Culture award from the University of Illinois at Urbana–Champaign and was listed in Foreign Policy Magazine "100 global thinkers 2010".

She served as the Oliver T. Carr, Jr. Professor in International Affairs at the Elliott School at The George Washington University, in Washington, D.C. from 2015 until 2016. She currently holds positions as the director of OPHI, associate professor at the Department of International Development at the University of Oxford, and is a distinguished research affiliate of the Kellogg Institute for International studies at the University of Notre Dame. Recently, as director of OPHI, Alkire has led research teams to aid with publications such as "The real wealth of nations", for the United Nations Development Programme's Human Development Report.

In May 2020, Alkire was awarded the Boris Mints Institute Prize for Research of Strategic Policy Solutions to Global Challenges for her contribution to the understanding of the dynamics and implications of poverty.
Alkire’s research interests include, multidimensional poverty measurement and analysis, welfare economics, the capability approach, and the measurement of freedoms and human development.

Bibliography

Thesis

Books 

  Hardback.
  Paperback.
 Reviewed by

Chapters in books 
2000–2004

 
 
 
 
 
 

2005–2009

 
 
 
 
 
 
 
 
 
 
 
 
 
 
 
 

2010 onwards

Journal articles 
1990–1999

 
 

2000–2009

 
 
 
 
 
 
 
 
 

2010 onwards

Other publications 
Human Development and Capability Association Briefing Note

 

Agence Française de Développement and European Development Research Network (AFD-EUDN) Conference Paper

 

Oxford Poverty & Human Development Initiative (OPHI) Working Papers

 
  
 
  
  
  
  
  

Oxford Poverty & Human Development Initiative (OPHI) Research in Progress Papers

Forthcoming

See also 
 Alkire Foster Method
 Feminist economics
 List of feminist economists
 Multidimensional Poverty Index
 Political philosophy

References

External links 
 Profile: Sabina Alkire

Academics of the University of Oxford
Alumni of Magdalen College, Oxford
American political philosophers
Feminist economists
Living people
Elliott School of International Affairs faculty
Political philosophers
University of Illinois College of Liberal Arts and Sciences alumni
George Washington University faculty
Women political writers
1969 births
Scientists from Göttingen